For the Good Times: A Tribute to Ray Price is the 65th solo studio album by country music singer-songwriter Willie Nelson, released on September 19, 2016. The album features cover versions of songs recorded by Ray Price, who had died in 2013. Nelson, a former member of Price's Cherokee Cowboys and friend, recorded the twelve-track album at Ocean Way Studios, where Price had recorded his final album, Beauty Is. Engineered by Fred Foster and Bergen White, the album features Vince Gill on six tracks. The content spans Honky Tonk and Countrypolitan.

Commercial performance
The album debuted at No. 5 on the Billboard'''s Top Country Albums chart, and No. 84 on Billboard'' 200, selling 7,000 copies in its first week. The second week it sold 2,600 copies.

Track listing

Personnel

 Brad Albin – upright bass
 Eddie Bayers – drums
 James Button – oboe
 Ellen Dockery – background vocals
 Larry Franklin – fiddle
 Paul Franklin – pedal steel guitar
 Steve Gibson – electric guitar
 Vince Gill – acoustic guitar, electric guitar, background vocals
 Carl Gorodetzky – string arrangements
 John Hobbs – piano
 Jim Horn – flute, saxophone
 Jon Mark Ivey – background vocals
 Jack Jezzro – bass guitar
 Jordan Lehning – background vocals
 Shane McConnell – background vocals
 Charlie McCoy – vibraphone
 The Nashville String Machine – strings
 Willie Nelson – lead vocals, acoustic guitar
 Larry Paxton – bass guitar
 Mickey Raphael – harmonica
 Andy Reiss – electric guitar
 Kenny Sears – fiddle
 Lisa Silver – background vocals
 Kira Small – background vocals
 Joe Spivey – fiddle 
 Jeff Taylor – accordion, piano
 Billy Thomas – drums
 Bergen White – conductor, background vocals
 John Willis – acoustic guitar

Charts

References

2016 albums
Willie Nelson albums
Albums produced by Fred Foster
Legacy Recordings albums